BNS Issa Khan  is a naval base of the Bangladeshi Navy in Chittagong district of Bangladesh. It is the largest base of Bangladesh Navy.

History
Before Bangladesh Liberation War, the naval base was named as PNS Bakhtiar. Post independence the base was named BNS Chittagong. Later, on December 10, 1974, Chittagong naval base was renamed as BNS Issa Khan by the former Prime Minister of Bangladesh Sheikh Mujibur Rahman, named after the medieval Baro-Bhuyan chieftain Isa Khan. On 8 November 2016 President Abdul Hamid awarded National Standard to BNS Issa Khan. 

The Issa Khan is currently under the command of the Commander Chattogram Naval Area (COMCHIT). About 1800 personnel serve at Isa Khan. Issa Khan was established for the training of officers and sailors, as well as operating as a naval base. Several training schools are located here.

See also
List of ships of the Bangladesh Navy
Bangladesh Navy Hydrographic & Oceanographic Center

References

Bangladesh Navy bases
Shore establishments of the Bangladesh Navy